Canning Dock on the River Mersey is part of the Port of Liverpool in Northern England. The dock is in the southern dock system, connected to Salthouse Dock to the south and with access to the river via the Canning Half Tide Dock to the west. The Canning Graving Docks are accessed from the dock.

History

Canning Dock was opened in 1737 as the Dry Dock, a protected tidal basin providing an entrance to Old Dock. Having been subsequently enclosed as a wet dock three years earlier, in 1832 it was officially named after the Liverpool MP George Canning. To the east is the site of Old Dock, built in 1709, which was the world's first enclosed commercial dock. Canning Dock would have initially served ships involved in the trans Atlantic slave trade.

Access to the northern half of the dock system was via Georges Dock, George's Basin and into Prince's Dock. In 1899, Georges Basin and George's Dock were filled in and the site is now the Pier Head.

Along with the Albert Dock and others in the immediate vicinity, Canning Dock was abandoned as a commercial shipping facility in 1972 due to the rising cost of dredging and falling traffic.

Graving docks 

Adjoining the dock basin are two dry graving dock built by Henry Berry between 1765 and 1769. They were lengthened and deepened by Jesse Hartley in the 1840s.
In the 1980s the graving docks became part of the Merseyside Maritime Museum and home to two of the museums ships, the pilot cutter Edmund Gardner and the schooner De Wadden.

Redevelopment
Canning Dock was restored from 1983 providing access to the Canning Graving Docks, which are part of the Merseyside Maritime Museum.

By March 2009 work was completed on a £22 million extension of the Leeds and Liverpool Canal, providing a further  of navigable waterway.

From Princes Dock, the extension passes the Pier Head and terminates at Canning Dock.
The extension includes a small canal basin at Mann Island near Pier Head, and a new lock providing access to Canning Dock.

References

Sources

Further reading

External links

 
   Canning Dock aerial photo
 Merseyside Maritime Museum

Grade II listed buildings in Liverpool
Liverpool docks